Kortedala IF is a Swedish football club located in Göteborg.

Background
Kortedala IF currently plays in Division 4 Göteborg A which is the sixth tier of Swedish football. They play their home matches at the Kortedalavallen in Göteborg.

The club is affiliated to Göteborgs Fotbollförbund. Kortedala IF have competed in the Svenska Cupen on 18 occasions and have played 37 matches in the competition.

Season to season

In their most successful period Kortedala IF competed in the following divisions:

In recent seasons Kortedala IF have competed in the following divisions:

Attendances
In recent seasons Kortedala IF have had the following average attendances:

Footnotes

External links
 Kortedala IF – Official website
 Kortedala IF Herrar – Official website
 Kortedala IF on Facebook

Football clubs in Gothenburg
Football clubs in Västra Götaland County